Colleton County is in the Lowcountry region of the U.S. state of South Carolina. As of the 2020 census, the population was 38,604. Its county seat is Walterboro. The county is named after Sir John Colleton, 1st Baronet, one of the eight Lords Proprietor of the Province of Carolina. After two previous incarnations, the current Colleton County was created in 1800.

History
In 1682, Colleton was created as one of the three original proprietary counties, located in the southwestern coastal portion of the new South Carolina Colony and bordering on the Combahee River.

In 1706, the county was divided between the new Saint Bartholomew and Saint Paul parishes. This area was developed for large plantations devoted to rice and indigo cultivation as commodity crops. The planters depended on the labor of African slaves transported to Charleston for that purpose. In the coastal areas, black slaves soon outnumbered white colonists, as they did across the colony by 1708.

In 1734, most of the coastal portion of Saint Paul's Parish was separated to form the new Saint John's Colleton Parish. In 1769, the three parishes were absorbed into the Charleston Judicial District, the southwestern portion of which was referred to as Saint Bartholomew's.

In 1800, the new Colleton District was formed from the western half of the Charleston District. In 1816, it annexed a small portion of northwestern Charleston District.

In 1868, under the Reconstruction era new state constitution, South Carolina districts were reorganized as counties. Officials were to be elected by the resident voters rather than by state officials, as was done previously, thus giving more democratic power to local residents.

In 1897, the northeastern portion of the county was separated to form the new Dorchester County, with its seat at Saint George.

In 1911, the portion of the county east of the Edisto River was annexed by Charleston County. In 1919 and again in 1920, tiny portions of northwestern Colleton County were annexed to Bamberg County.

In March 1975, the town of Edisto Beach was annexed to Colleton County from Charleston County, thus bringing the county to its present size.

Geography

It is the fifth-largest county in South Carolina by land area and fourth-largest by total area.

National protected area
 Ashepoo-Combahee-Edisto (ACE) Basin National Estuarine Research Reserve (part)
 Ernest F. Hollings ACE Basin National Wildlife Refuge (part)

State and local protected areas/sites
 Bear Island Wildlife Management Area
 Colleton State Park
 Donnelley Wildlife Management Area
 Givhans Ferry State Park (part)
 Lowcountry Raptors
 Old Walterboro Train Depot
 Pon-Pon Chapel of Ease
 Tuskegee Airmen Memorial
 Walterboro Historic District

Major water bodies 
 Ashepoo River
 Atlantic Ocean
 Edisto River
 Intracoastal Waterway
 Salkehatchie River

Adjacent counties
 Orangeburg County - north
 Dorchester County - northeast
 Charleston County - east
 Beaufort County - south
 Hampton County - west
 Allendale County - west
 Bamberg County - northwest

Major highways

Major infrastructure 
 Lowcountry Regional Airport

Demographics

2020 census

As of the 2020 United States census, there were 38,604 people, 15,075 households, and 9,565 families residing in the county.

2010 census
As of the 2010 United States Census, there were 38,892 people, 15,131 households, and 10,449 families living in the county. The racial makeup of the county was 57.0% white, 39.0% black or African American, 0.8% American Indian, 0.3% Asian, 1.3% from other races, and 1.5% from two or more races. Those of Hispanic or Latino origin made up 2.8% of the population.

Of the 15,131 households, 33.5% had children under the age of 18 living with them, 44.9% were married couples living together, 18.4% had a female householder with no husband present, 30.9% were non-families, and 26.8% of all households were made up of individuals. The average household size was 2.54 and the average family size was 3.07. The median age was 40.7 years.

The median income for a household in the county was $33,263 and the median income for a family was $40,955. Males had a median income of $36,622 versus $25,898 for females. The per capita income for the county was $17,842. About 17.7% of families and 21.3% of the population were below the poverty line, including 28.3% of those under age 18 and 17.2% of those age 65 or over.

2000 census
As of the census of 2000, there were 38,264 people, 14,470 households, and 10,490 families living in the county. The population density was 36 people per square mile (14/km2). There were 18,129 housing units at an average density of 17 per square mile (7/km2). The racial makeup of the county was 55.52% White, 42.18% Black or African American, 0.63% Native American, 0.25% Asian, 0.04% Pacific Islander, 0.56% from other races, and 0.82% from two or more races. 1.44% of the population were Hispanic or Latino of any race.

There were 14,470 households, out of which 33.10% had children under the age of 18 living with them, 51.10% were married couples living together, 16.80% had a female householder with no husband present, and 27.50% were non-families. 24.00% of all households were made up of individuals, and 10.10% had someone living alone who was 65 years of age or older. The average household size was 2.62 and the average family size was 3.11.

In the county, the population was spread out, with 27.50% under the age of 18, 8.00% from 18 to 24, 26.90% from 25 to 44, 24.70% from 45 to 64, and 12.90% who were 65 years of age or older. The median age was 36 years. For every 100 females there were 91.90 males. For every 100 females age 18 and over, there were 87.90 males.

The median income for a household in the county was $29,733, and the median income for a family was $34,169. Males had a median income of $28,518 versus $19,228 for females. The per capita income for the county was $14,831. About 17.30% of families and 21.10% of the population were below the poverty line, including 28.70% of those under age 18 and 19.10% of those age 65 or over.

According to the 2000 Census, the Colleton County population is nearly 75% rural, with the exception of the Walterboro Urban Cluster (2000 pop.: 10,064). The total county population is also designated as the Walterboro Micropolitan Statistical Area.

Ancestry
The largest self-identified ancestry groups in Colleton County in 2019 were:

 39% African-American
 32.3% English
 6.5% German
 5.2% Irish

Law and government

Law enforcement
In 2019, County Sheriff R.A. Strickland was charged with domestic violence after punching a woman in his home.  the current sheriff is Guerry L. "Buddy" Hill Jr.

Politics

Education
 Colleton County School District operates public schools, including Colleton County High School.
 Degrees can be earned at the University of South Carolina Salkehatchie in Walterboro.

Communities

Cities
 Walterboro (county seat and largest city)

Towns
 Cottageville
 Edisto Beach
 Lodge
 Smoaks
 Ruffin
 Williams

Census-designated places
 Islandton
 Jacksonboro

Unincorporated communities
 Green Pond
 Hendersonville
 Neyles
 Round O
 Ruffin
 Canadys

See also
 List of counties in South Carolina
 National Register of Historic Places listings in Colleton County, South Carolina
 National Wildlife Refuge

References

External links

 
 
 Colleton County History and Images

 
1800 establishments in South Carolina
Populated places established in 1800